Rucentra punctifrons is a species of beetle in the family Cerambycidae. It was described by Breuning in 1940. It is known from the Philippines.

References

Apomecynini
Beetles described in 1940